Lia Vollack (born c. 1965) is an American record executive.

Vollack graduated from high school at 15, and the year after worked as a roadie for Johnnie Thunders and the Ramones.  In 1974 she moved to New York City, where she would find work as a sound designer for Broadway and Off-Broadway shows such as On the Waterfront and The Heidi Chronicles; she continued working as a sound effects freelancer and music editor until 1997, when she was hired by Sony.  In 2000 she became executive director of the Worldwide Music division of Sony Pictures Entertainment, in which role she was in charge of releasing successful soundtracks to films such as Charlie's Angels.  She has since become the main force behind the release of soundtracks and film scores for films released by Sony Pictures.  She is creator of the record label Madison Gate, dedicated to publishing film music that might otherwise go unreleased, and has been named to the Billboard Power 100 list on multiple occasions.

In 2016 Vollack was named president of Columbia Live Stage, the live entertainment arm of Sony Pictures Entertainment. She is married to set designer Derek McLane, and is stepmother to his three children.
In 2021 she served as the producer of MJ The Musical, a new Michael Jacksons's Dance Show in Brodway, which is planning a tour in the United States.

Awards
Billboard Women in Music Top Executives List - 2013, 2014, 2015

References

1960s births
Year of birth uncertain
Living people
American sound designers
American music industry executives
Sony Pictures Entertainment people
20th-century American businesspeople
21st-century American businesspeople
20th-century American businesswomen
21st-century American businesswomen